Sitar-e Mahmud (also Romanized as Sītār-e Maḩmūd) is a village in Sand-e Mir Suiyan Rural District, Dashtiari District, Chabahar County, Sistan and Baluchestan Province, Iran. At the 2006 census, its population was 495, in 111 families.

References 

Populated places in Chabahar County